Marília is an H chondrite meteorite that fell to Earth on October 5, 1971, in Marília, São Paulo, Brazil.

Classification
It is classified as H4-ordinary chondrite.

References

Bibliography
 Gomes, C.B. & Keil, K. (1980) Brazilian Stony Meteorites: University of New Mexico Press: Albuquerque. pp. 162.
 Graham, A. L., Bevan, A. W. R. & Hutchison, B. (1985) Catalogue of Meteorites (4/e). University of Arizona Press: Tucson.

See also 
 Glossary of meteoritics
 Ordinary chondrite

Meteorites found in Brazil